Kemesha Kelly was born on 22 June 1989. She was crowned Miss Jamaica Festival Queen for Jamaica's Fiftieth Anniversary of Independence (6 August 2012).

In 2007, she was part of the three-member team that represented Jamaica and the Caribbean region at the British Parliament World Slavery Youth Debate in Westminster, England.

In her adult life, she has remained active in advocating for youth and was the civil society representative who signed Jamaica's 2013 Social Partnership Agreement.

References

External links
http://jamaica-gleaner.com/article/commentary/20160226/put-youth-issues-front-burner
http://www.jamaicaobserver.com/magazines/allwoman/Kemesha-Kelly--social-advocate_45113
http://jis.gov.jm/first-social-partnership-agreement-inked-at-kings-house/

1989 births
Living people
Jamaican activists